Magical Circle Guru Guru is a Japanese manga by Hiroyuki Etō, which was serialized in Enix's Monthly Shōnen Gangan from 1992 to 2003. It was later adapted into an anime series on October 13, 1994. A second manga series was serialized in Gangan Online in 2012.

Mahōjin Guru Guru is a light series aimed at older children. It contains occasional toilet gags and some innuendo. It also is a parody of early role-playing video games (RPGs), particularly turn-based games, such as those in the Dragon Quest series. The narrator speaks in place of the dialogue in such games, and this is one of the comedy elements of the show. Information boxes are often displayed on screen with accompanying narration in the traditional RPG style. The overall goal of the two main characters, Nike and Kukuri, is to defeat Giri, the ruler of the darkness. Since the anime is based on an RPG, several side quests need to be completed before they are able to locate him.

A new series based on the manga animated by Production I.G aired from July to December 2017. Crunchyroll streamed the anime, marking the first anime from the Mahoujin Guru Guru franchise to receive an official English release.

Characters

Main characters

Nike (pronounced Nee-kay) is the protagonist. Nike's father, Bado, had always wished to be a Hero but due to the lack of any great evil to fight against, he had to give up on his dream. However, he made his son undergo hard training as a child in hopes that one day a great evil would arise and Nike could fight it. Because of this, Nike is a competent but cowardly fighter. Like Kukuri, he is initially immature and inexperienced. Nike is from Jimina Mura, (which translates to Plain Old Village). Initially, Nike wants to be a Wizard as he finds the thought of casting a fireball "cool", though his parents convince him to be the Hero. He initially thinks that he is of the Hero class, as do others. It is later revealed that he is a Thief. Despite this,  he can use all the abilities of the Hero class, including Gallant Pose, which only a Hero can do.

Bado is Nike's father. He received a critical hit in the form of a punch the first time he held the infant Nike. After that he trained Nike to be a Hero. Right before he departs for Kodai Castle, Nike offers him his old helmet. The helmet is cracked, but Nike suggests he will wear it by tilting it to the side. Bado kicks Nike into the air and keeps the helmet on, saying that he looks like a gang leader. 

 is Nike's mother. She knocks out Nike with a poison dart when he tries to flee. She cooks him a meal that resembles an adventuring map. Nike has to eat things in the proper order, which he does not, and ends up poisoned.

Kukuri is a gentle-hearted magic apprentice. She has grown under the care of Jimuna Town's old witch, who received her when she was a baby from a wandering stranger, supposedly the last member of the Migu Migu Tribe. Being the last remaining member of the Migu Migu, Kukuri learns the dark summoning magic only the Migu Migu can use known as Guru Guru; it consists of drawing circles on the ground with a staff. She is eager and shows great affection towards Nike, almost always calling him "Mr. Hero" (Yusha in Japanese). She is extremely lucky or good in several sports and games such as rock-paper-scissors and cricket. She becomes very angry when someone says anything about her appearance. When she was steaming nervously, she got very angry when Nike called her a steamed octopus; she almost killed a monster who called her fat when she was dressed up like a Meke Meke.

Old Witch is an old woman who raised Kukuri. She is called obaba (old hag) and cow by Kukuri. She lied to Kukuri that chocolate is poison to children to keep her from eating hers.

Rivals
Ena is a beautiful Wizard who is in love with Gail. She is dressed like a belly dancer.

Gaile is a Fighter that thinks he is a Hero. Despite Gail's high level, he loses most battles, even the one with Nike the first time they met. Gail and Ena reveal that they usually do not have enough money to buy food as they use it to buy equipment; it is they reason they lose all the time.

Others
Kita Kita Oyaji
Voiced by Kenichi Ogata (1994-2000), Katsuyuki Konishi (2017)

Oyaji (real name Udberg Eldol), or "Old Man", used to be the mayor of Kitano, also called North Town. When the town's traditional dance Kita Kita could no longer be performed because no more girls were born, he started dancing it himself. He believes that as a result of a curse, they had commercialized the dance. His dance is often regarded as creepy and disgusting by the other characters. He usually follows the duo of Nike and Kukuri around. He wears a hula dress and usually finds some excuse to perform his Kita Kita dance, much to the duo's dismay. Apparently, he wants to pass on the Kita Kita dance to the next generation and is looking for trainees. In "Doki Doki Legend," it is learned he accidentally developed muscles from all the dancing and is able to defeat monsters in one punch. He has 1650 Hit Points in "Pickle of Happiness" that make him nearly immortal and able to sustain extreme levels of abuse that is inflicted upon him all the time.
Toma
Voiced by Yukiyo Fujii (2017)

He joins the party and meets Nike and Kukuri in North village where he pretends to be of the Priest class. In "Doki Doki Legend" he plays a major role in Nike's party as a Magical engineer with the ability to invent magical items. He is shown to be level 12 when Nike and Kukuri were 2 and 3 respectively. Toma was interested in Migu.

Migu's first encounter with Nike and Kukuri was in North Village, where she put on a front as a martial artist at the party they were attending .She tries to use sex appeal against the ratman guard at the dungeon of Mountain Saw-edge but the ratman flees as she scares him. She is Zaza's sister.

Zaza joins the party and meets Nike and Kukuri in north village where he pretends to be a wizard. Zaza was interested in Kukuri. He is Migu's brother.
Juju
Voiced by Yuri Amano (Season 1 and Movie), Kae Araki (Season 2) (1994), Yō Taichi (2017)

She is a Priestess of the Purato people. In "Doki Doki Legend" she joins Nike's party as a warrior priest. Her magic comes from praying to Purato's God. She proves to be a good exorcist. She appears very powerful but is impeded in her spell casting as seen when her combat Altar was broken by Gochinko's sword style.
Gochinko
Voiced by Rikiya Koyama (2017)

He is a sword trainer and master of 'stupid' or 'queer' swordsmanship. This unique form of sword-fighting, which he teaches wearing a rundown small hall, specializes in making the enemy laugh to distract his attention. Gochinko places flowers on parts of his body and takes strange stances to make the enemy laugh and thus inflicts great damage as he is distracted. He tries to teach Nike swordsmanship and judges that Nike is very bad at it. He is a Purato agent and serves JuJu.
Gipple
Voiced by Urara Takano (1994), Takahiro Sakurai (2017)

He is a small wind spirit who occasionally guides the duo, though he vanishes at the first sign of trouble. He can expand his cloak into a tent and store items in it. Gipple has an anthropomorphic body under the cloak and wears fundoshi. Gipple seems disgusted by any emotional or dramatic demonstration and expresses this whenever possible.
Lunlun Felmère
Voiced by Naoko Matsui (1994), Saori Ōnishi (2017)

She is a woman from a magic society who helps Nike and Kukuri from time to time. She uses snake magic and is the one who gave Gipple to Nike. In "Doki Doki Legend" she falls in love with Nike's Thief mentor Sly. Nike cannot help laughing when he hears her name and hides behind a rock to avoid being noticed.
King Uruga XIII
Voiced by Atsushi Ono

He resides in Kodai castle. He is a short man with a long mustache and long black hair. He gives 800 Rin to Nike and Kukuri to aid their quest in defeating Giri.

Guriel is a blonde fairy with a pink tutu and a ribbon on her head. She knew the secret weak point of Kisegi Gold and was imprisoned when she told about a hundred of her friends. After she was freed, she left famous rice crackers as a gift. Fairy Elder, No idea/nothingness faeries and Confusion faeries are others in the story.

Beegain is a sage, who teaches Nike about Light magic and the Kira Kira sword.

Wugenvillia is found in Potoma Academy in the Potoma kingdom.

SteinWetts is also called Wetts.
Ardenberg and Wanchin

Monsters
Lord Giri

Voiced by: Ryūzaburō Ōtomo

Giri is the series' main antagonist. After having been sealed by Guruguru magic for 300 years during the reign of King Uruga III, he returned and unleashed his army of monsters to take over the world. Since his only weakness is Guruguru magic, he tries to destroy Kukuri, the last Guruguru user in existence. He is always depicted sitting on a big armchair, completely hidden in a dark cloak with only his red eyes glowing through. In his demonic-looking hand he always holds a glass of wine.
Raid
Voiced by: Nobuhiko Okamoto (2017)

He is a handsome demon-prince who is fond of Kukuri. His special name for her is "Pink Bomb," and he continually tries to split her away from Nike to fall in love with him. His magic attacks are powerful, but often involve complicated incantations and unusual results, such as gastric distress.

Ratmen are very low-ranked type of monsters. They sometimes speak in Prose. They have 3 HP. 

Rai Rai is a flying monster that resembles a bird.

Kisegi is a monster that fights with a club or a spear, has three horns on his head and adds -sss after every sentence. He is somehow related to cats, as he is extremely affected by catnip. He has 5 HP. 

Kisegi Gold is a Kisegi and boss of the dungeon at Mountain Saw-edge. His weak point is to the right of the scale below the crest between the two horns on the back of his shoulders. He appears stupid and has Ratmen write his lines. He can breathe fire, inflict double damage when enraged, and is part salamander. He usually fights with a huge sword.

Man-eating plant is found in a room in the dungeon of Mountain Saw-Edge.

NG is a blue monster sorcerer in a death pool.

Chikuri Demon is a teammate with Search Eye and will tell lies to her enemies to cause division until they attack each other. She loves to talk and often unwittingly reveals the plans of Giri.

Search Eye will scan his opponent for weaknesses then produce an illusion to lower his or her guard. At this point Chikuri will join the attack.

Mandoragora is a monster with a gourd shaped watermelon for a head and tree branches for legs and arms. Its torso is covered in leaves. The top of its head opens up to reveal stems and red petals. This monster was always unlucky with girls, so he terrorized their village and demanded girls, who he made go through hard labor. Mandoragora can shield himself with his leaves and gain protection from fire. His main attack is Black pepper spores that launch from his head. His stems can be used as limbs or whips and his hands as claws.

Yanban is a red man-like dog with intense eyebrows wearing a grey cloak. It is located in great numbers in the fairy village mountain and fights with a woodsman axe which it sometimes throws. It also wears a hat with several white feathers on top and white sandals. Its bite is venomous and deadly. The Yanban can also play with his target and lick his targets which makes them disgusted.

Lovelovella is a heart-shaped creature with long hair. Her large sparkling eyes cause her opponents to laugh, so she can use her hair to smack them while their guard is down.

Vacuum sucks in the surrounding area until its enemies are consumed. As he sucks in air, he expands larger and larger. He seems to be easily punctured.

Gizaier, Darklings, and Dora Dora are other monsters.

Items
MekeMeke Robe is a robe with high defense against Magic worn by Kukuri.
Star shard sword has Attack power 6. It is loaned to Nike at North village and made from Star shards mined from Mountain Saw-edge. The sword spirit can stop time and create a miracle when its wielder is in immediate danger. However, the miracle is a surprise. The miracle was to Level-up Kita Kita Oyaji, giving him Speed+3, Massle+2 and Beauty-5.
Smoke shield is an incense that creates a full armor, leaving only the face exposed with little weight that protects from fire and has a good defense rating. It was given to Nike at North village.
North village sword inflicts 200 times more damage than a normal sword but is 200 times as heavy.
North village armor provides 500 times more protection than a normal armor but is 500 times as heavy.
La-La-La shield can deflect any physical or magical attack but is cursed and once equipped the wielder starts dancing and singing.
Old magic staff is Kukuri's staff prior to leaving the old witch.
Guru Guru staff is Kukuri's magic circle staff.
Protective flower Ornament protected Kukuri from Kisegi Gold's fire breath and broke into pieces. It is Nike's gift.
Holy pot the Legendary treasure was given to Nike and Kukuri at North village as a reward for lifting the curse. It is a 200-year-old pot that makes tasty food without requiring fire.
Fairy sword is a wooden short sword given by the fairies to Kukuri that summons a flyer or flag that writes "I love Hero, By Kukuri".
Dark Weather Vane is an item that can detect Giri.
Level-up Potions are small potion bottles containing a liquid of dark color that can level up characters.
Chocolate has the capacity to restore Kururi's Magic points.
Flute of Tension is a magical flute which, when played, causes everyone to get an eerie feeling.
Wizard Glasses are glasses that give the user the ability to see through magic illusions.
Stealth Coin causes the user to become invisible to everyone except those using the same coin. The effects only work when the coin is in the user's mouth.
Magic Bracelet of Earth is one of the two magic bracelets of Shugi village. It is silvery blue and glows blue when used. It can create earthquakes and its power can be used to create blue energy beams that travel along the ground. It was given to Nike at the Shugi Ruins and was taken away when JuJu used it along with the Magic Bracelet of Heaven to break the third seal.
Magic Bracelet of Heaven is one of the two magic bracelets of Shugi Village. It is golden. It can create wings of light that can allow the user to fly. It was given to Kukuri when she leveled up at the Training Tower and taken away when JuJu used it along with the Magic Bracelet of Earth to break the third seal.

Spells
There are three kinds of magic in the show. Light magic, Dark magic and Guru Guru, which is considered to be Dark magic at first but later revealed to be Free magic. Nike tells Obaba that at first, he thought that Guru Guru was something sexual (ecchi). Guru Guru has random effects when a spell fails. Light magic has to do with controlling natural forces, Dark magic with controlling unnatural forces and creatures and Guru Guru with summoning. The spells cast by Kukuri gain power-ups in effects and certain changes in appearance as she increases her level and knowledge of Guru Guru.

Media

First anime series
The first series Mahoujin Guru Guru (produced by Nippon Animation) has 45 episodes. It covers the content of manga volumes 1 - 4 and some other adventures not in the manga.

After being sealed for 300 years, the demon lord Giri reawakens and sends off his monster minions to wreak havoc in the world. King Uruga XIII thus, decides to place announcements everywhere in the kingdom in search of a legendary hero who can defeat Giri. In the king's castle a competition will be held to discover who the true hero is.
Forced by his parents to go to the castle, Nike first visits the witch's house, where Kukuri joins him.
Together they travel around the world defeating monsters, gaining new abilities, trying to uncover the mysteries surrounding the Migu Migu tribe and making many friends while confronting enemies.

Movie
In the movie, Nike and Kukuri learn about the "Pickle of Happiness", an item which will grant a wish to the one who eats it. With the help of old friends, they must beat the monsters to the Pickle and convince its guardian residing in Megalo mountain, the Megalo dragon to give it to them.

Doki Doki Legend
The second anime series was created in 2000, six years after the original. It covers the contents of manga volumes 5 to 11 (there are 16 manga volumes in total).

Nike and Kukuri receive a message from Wanchin, the old leader of the Migu Migu, who tells them they need to find the 4 elemental swords in order to defeat Giri. Thus, a new adventure starts.

At the end of the manga Nike and Kukuri seal Giri, though this is not shown in the animation.

Reboot series
A third series was announced in January 2017 and adapts the manga from the first chapter. It was animated by Production I.G and aired from July 11 to December 19, 2017 consisting 24 episodes. Hiroshi Ikehata directed the anime, with Hisaaki Okui handled the series composition and Naoyuki Asano designed the characters. ORESAMA performed the first opening theme "Trip Trip Trip" and TECHNOBOYS PULCRAFT GREEN-FUND is composing the music and performed the ending theme "Round & Round & Round" alongside Bonjour Suzuki. ORESAMA also performed the second opening theme "Ryuusei Dance Floor". TECHNOBOYS PULCRAFT GREEN-FUND also performed the second ending theme "Magical Circle" alongside Shoko Nakagawa.

Games
Published by Enix, 
Mahōjin Guru Guru (SNES)
Mahōjin Guru Guru (Game Boy), published by Takara
Mahōjin Guru Guru 2 (SNES)
Doki Doki Densetsu Mahōjin Guru Guru (Game Boy Color)
Magical Battle Arena (crossover video game, Microsoft Windows)

Reception
Since 1992, the manga has printed over 14 million copies in Japan.

See also
Akazukin Chacha
List of Square Enix manga franchises

References

The anime encyclopedia: a guide to Japanese animation since 1917

External links
Guru Guru @ Nippon Animation

1992 manga
1994 anime television series debuts
1996 anime films
2000 anime television series debuts
2017 anime television series debuts
Comedy anime and manga
Fantasy anime and manga
Gangan Comics manga
Production I.G
Shōnen manga
Square Enix franchises
TV Asahi original programming
TV Tokyo original programming
Video games developed in Japan